Susan Buck-Morss is an American philosopher and intellectual historian.

She is currently Professor of Political Science at the CUNY Graduate Center, and professor emeritus in the Government Department at Cornell University, where she taught from 1978 to 2012. Her interdisciplinary work involves but is not limited to the fields of Art History, Architecture, Comparative Literature, Cultural Studies, German studies, History, Philosophy, and Visual Studies. She has won a Getty Scholar Grant, a Fulbright Award, and a Guggenheim Fellowship for her work.

Books
 The Origin of Negative Dialectics: Theodor W. Adorno, Walter Benjamin, and the Frankfurt Institute (1977)
 The Dialectics of Seeing. Walter Benjamin and the Arcades Project (1989)
 Dreamworld and Catastrophe. The Passing of Mass Utopia in East and West (2002)
 Thinking Past Terror: Islamism and Critical Theory on the Left (2003) [Updated Edition, (2006)]
 Hegel, Haiti, and Universal History (2009)

References

External links
  Buck-Morss discusses her intellectual formation in an interview with Peter Shea

20th-century American philosophers
American political philosophers
Living people
Walter Benjamin scholars
Graduate Center, CUNY faculty
Vassar College alumni
Yale University alumni
Year of birth missing (living people)
21st-century American philosophers